Vidin Heights are predominantly ice-covered heights rising to 604 m on Varna Peninsula, eastern Livingston Island in the South Shetland Islands, Antarctica. The feature is approximately 8 km long from the north end of Leslie Gap east-northeastwards to Inott Point and 9.6 km north-northeastwards to Sayer Nunatak.  The summit, Miziya Peak, is located 9.25 km north by east of Mount Bowles, 4.24 km north-northeast of Leslie Hill, 9.47 km south of Williams Point and 7.52 km west of Edinburgh Hill.  The heights feature also Samuel Peak 1.9 km east-southeast of Miziya Peak, and Sharp Peak at their east-northeast extremity.  The heights surmount Saedinenie Snowfield to the northwest, Rose Valley Glacier to the northeast, Debelt Glacier and Panega Glacier to the southeast, and Kaliakra Glacier to the south.

The feature is named after the city of Vidin in northwestern Bulgaria. This is one of the Bulgarian names bestowed on hitherto nameless geographical features by the Tangra 2004/05 Expedition.

Location

See also
 Miziya Peak
 Arbanasi Nunatak
 Livingston Island

Maps
 L.L. Ivanov et al. Antarctica: Livingston Island and Greenwich Island, South Shetland Islands. Scale 1:100000 topographic map. Sofia: Antarctic Place-names Commission of Bulgaria, 2005.
 L.L. Ivanov. Antarctica: Livingston Island and Greenwich, Robert, Snow and Smith Islands. Scale 1:120000 topographic map. Troyan: Manfred Wörner Foundation, 2010.  (First edition 2009. )
 Antarctic Digital Database (ADD). Scale 1:250000 topographic map of Antarctica. Scientific Committee on Antarctic Research (SCAR). Since 1993, regularly updated.
 L.L. Ivanov. Antarctica: Livingston Island and Smith Island. Scale 1:100000 topographic map. Manfred Wörner Foundation, 2017.

References
 Vidin Heights. SCAR Composite Antarctic Gazetteer
 Bulgarian Antarctic Gazetteer. Antarctic Place-names Commission. (details in Bulgarian, basic data in English)
 L.L. Ivanov, Livingston Island: Tangra Mountains, Komini Peak, west slope new rock route; Lyaskovets Peak, first ascent; Zograf Peak, first ascent; Vidin Heights, Melnik Peak, Melnik Ridge, first ascent, The American Alpine Journal, 2005, 312–315.
 Antarctica: Livingston Island, Climb Magazine, Issue 14, Kettering, UK, April 2006, pp. 89-91.

External links
Vidin Heights. Copernix satellite image

Landforms of Livingston Island
Bulgaria and the Antarctic
Vidin